1996-97 was the 22nd season that Division 1 operated as the second tier of ice hockey in Sweden, below the top-flight Elitserien (now the SHL).

Format 
Division 1 was divided into four starting groups of 10 teams each. The top two teams in each group qualified for the Allsvenskan, while the remaining eight teams had to compete in a qualifying round. The teams were given zero to seven bonus points based on their finish in the first round. The top two teams from each qualifying round qualified for the playoffs. The last-place team in each of the qualifying groups was relegated directly to Division 2, while the second-to-last-place team had to play in a relegation series to retain their spot in Division 1 for the following season.

Of the eight teams in the Allsvenskan, the top two qualified directly for the Kvalserien. The third-sixth place teams qualified for the second round of the playoffs. The two playoff winners qualified for the Kvalserien, in which the top two teams qualified for the following Elitserien season.

Regular season

Northern Group

First round

Qualification round

Western Group

First round

Qualification round

Eastern Group

First round

Qualification round

Southern Group

First round

Qualification round

Allsvenskan

Playoffs

First round 
 Timrå IK - Nyköpings HC 0:2 (5:6 OT, 2:3 OT)
 Sunne IK - Västerviks IK 0:2 (3:4, 2:4)
 Uppsala AIS - Kiruna IF 0:2 (2:3, 1:2 OT)
 Tingsryds AIF - Grums IK 2:0 (3:0, 5:3)

Second round 
 Mora IK - Tingsryds AIF 2:0 (5:3, 3:2 OT)
 Skellefteå AIK - Kiruna IF 2:1 (2:0, 3:4, 5:0)
 Linköpings HC - Nyköpings HC 2:0 (5:2, 7:3)
 Huddinge IK - Västerviks IK 0:2 (1:2, 1:2)

Third round 
 Linköpings HC - Västerviks IK 2:0 (5:2, 3:0)
 Skellefteå AIK - Mora IK 1:2 (3:2 OT, 2:3, 2:3 OT)

Elitserien promotion

External links 
Season on hockeyarchives.info

Swedish Division I seasons
Swed
2